Ficus abutilifolia, the large-leaved rock fig, is a species of African rock-splitting fig that occurs in two disjunct regions, one population north, and another south of the equator. The two populations are pollinated by different fig wasps, and are morphologically distinct. It is named for the similarity of its broadly ovate leaves to that of Abutilon. It is virtually restricted to cliff faces and rock outcrops, and is easily recognized from its large, glabrous leaves and smooth, pale bark.

Species associations
Nigeriella fusciceps Wiebes is the pollinating wasp for the northern population, and Elisabethiella comptoni Wiebes pollinates the southern population. Philocaenus rotundus is an associated but non-pollinating wasp.

Gallery

References

External links
 

Trees of Africa
abutilifolia
Taxa named by Friedrich Anton Wilhelm Miquel